William Channing A'Beckett (1846 – 16 June 1929) was an Australian politician.

He was born in Sydney to Arthur Martin A'Beckett, a doctor who served in the New South Wales Legislative Council, and Emma Louise Elwin. He was sent to England to be educated, returning to Australia to farm in New South Wales in 1865. On 23 February 1884 he married Jessie Gertrude Smith, with whom he had five children. He owned property in the Wellington area, and in 1889 was elected to the New South Wales Legislative Assembly as the Free Trade member for Bogan. Defeated in 1891, he was re-elected in a by-election in 1892 but did not contest the 1894 election. A'Beckett died at Wellington in 1929.

References

 

1846 births
1929 deaths
Members of the New South Wales Legislative Assembly
Free Trade Party politicians